Help is a 2021 British psychological thriller film written and directed by Blake Ridder, produced in association with Lucas A. Ferrara. The film stars Emily Redpath, Sarah Alexandra Marks, and Louis James with a celebrity cameo of Duncan James.

Plot
A painful break up prompts Grace to visit her friend Liv who is living in the idyllic English countryside with her boyfriend Edward and his dog Polly. The trio start the weekend in high spirits but soon turns into chaos, as well-kept secrets are exposed and the friends come to see each other in a whole new light.

Cast
 Emily Redpath as Grace
 Sarah Alexandra Marks as Liv
 Louis James as Edward
 Blake Ridder as David
 Duncan James as Jogger
 Stuart Wolfe-Murray as Chris
 Amy Jim as Barbara

Production 
Help was shot in a single location over a period of twelve days in 2020, during the COVID-19 lockdown.

Release 
Help will be released on digital downloads from 15 February 2022.

Help premiered at Cinequest film festival in March 2021.
Showing at the fisheye film festival April 2021.

Reception 
Film Threat reviewed Help, writing that "Be patient with the plot, including a story of a lesbian encounter that seems only to exist to be provocative. It’s there for a reason and plays into the ultimate payoff at the end. It’s worth the wait." Starburst also reviewed the movie, stating that it "plays well as a melodrama, but also has enough going for it to recommend to fans of psychological thrillers."

References

External links
 

 

2021 films
British thriller films
2020s English-language films
2020s British films